Rail yards in the United States
Railway buildings and structures in Maine
Buildings and structures in South Portland, Maine
1922 establishments in Maine

Rigby Yard is a classification yard in South Portland, Maine, operated by Pan Am Railways, a subsidiary of CSX Transportation. It was originally constructed between 1922 and 1923 on the site of the former Rigby Park by the Portland Terminal Company, a subsidiary of the Maine Central Railroad. As built, it had capacity for over 2,000 railroad cars at a time. The yard handled up to 75,000 railroad cars per year during the 1980s, with operations by both the Boston and Maine Railroad and the Maine Central.

References